The name Papilio arcas has been applied by authors to several different species of butterfly:
 Papilio arcas Drury, 1773 now referred to Ephyriades arcas (Hesperiidae)
 Papilio arcas Rottemburg, 1775 now referred to Phengaris nausithous (Lycaenidae)
 Papilio arcas Cramer, 1777 now referred to Pandemos pasiphae (Riodinidae)
 Papilio arcas Stoll, 1782 now referred to Parides eurimedes eurimedes (Papilionidae)
 Papilio arcas Fabricius, 1787 now referred to Lycaena orus (Lycaenidae)